Kyawswa II of Pinya (1328–1359) was king of Pinya from 1350 to 1359. He had little effective control over his southern vassals but agreed to an alliance with Pinya's longtime rival Sagaing to face off the northern Shan state of Mong Mao. In 1358–59, while he tried to help Sagaing in the north, his home region of Kyaukse came under attack first by his erstwhile vassal Toungoo, and later by Mong Mao Shans. He died during the Shan raids.

His royal decree dated 12 March 1359 is the earliest known land survey (sittan) in Burmese history.

Early life
The future king was born to Princess Nan Lon Me of Pagan and Viceroy Kyawswa of Pinle,  early 1328. A grandson of King Thihathu of Myinsaing–Pinya and King Kyawswa of Pagan, he hailed from both Myinsaing and Pagan royal lines. He had five full siblings and at least two half-siblings. He grew up in Pinle but moved to Pinya in 1344 when his father became the undisputed ruler of Pinya Kingdom. Although he was only the second eldest son, the younger Kyawswa was made the heir-apparent; his elder brother Uzana who had weak/paralyzed legs was passed over. The appointment apparently did not go well with Kyawswa I's brother Nawrahta, who defected to Sagaing in 1349.

Reign
He succeeded his father on 12 December 1350, following his father's death. At his coronation, he took the title Thiri Tri Bhawanaditya Pawara Dhamma Yaza and Saw Omma of Thayet as his chief queen. The king was popularly known as Lay-zi Shin ("Lord of Four White Elephants") for the four white elephants inherited from his father. Like the Pinya rulers before him, Kyawswa II's effective authority never really extended beyond the core Kyaukse granary. He never attempted to impose tighter control over his southernmost vassals Prome (Pyay) and Toungoo (Taungoo), which were practically independent. Soon after his accession, at least one key governor, Swa Saw Ke of Yamethin, defected to Sagaing, the kingdom immediately north of Pinya. But no wars broke out between Pinya and Sagaing, which at been at odds since 1315. Neither capital had much control its vassals, and were in no position to start external wars. When Princess Soe Min of Sagaing and her husband Thado Hsinhtein of Tagaung, acting as emissaries for King Tarabya II of Sagaing, proposed a truce in 1351, Kyawswa II readily agreed to it.

The truce brought Pinya and Sagaing branches of the Myinsaing dynasty together for the first time since 1315. The two ruling houses may have been forced into the truce by an emerging threat in the north. The Shan state of Mong Mao (Maw in Burmese), led by Si Kefa (Tho Kho Bwa) had successfully waged a rebellion against the rapidly declining Mongol Empire, driving back three separate Mongol expeditions in 1342, 1346 and 1348. By 1355, the Mongols had given up any hope of regaining any control, and had to be satisfied with what they called submission by Mong Mao. The "submission", even if true, was nominal, and freed Mong Mao to concentrate their energy and aggression elsewhere. Si Kefa's first target was Sagaing, which directly south of Mong Mao. The Shan raids now forced Sagaing looking for a closer alliance with Pinya. In 1357/58, Queen Soe Min sent her pre-teen daughter Shin Saw Gyi to Kyawswa, who raised his half-cousin, once removed, to queen.

However, Kyawswa did not command enough manpower to help Sagaing and defend his home region at once. Indeed, when Maw Shans attacked Sagaing from the north in the following dry season of 1358–59, Pinya's southern vassal Toungoo not only revolted but raided the lightly defended Kyaukse capital region itself. The northern operations were no better. By early 1359, Maw Shan forces had broken through Sagaing's territory and breached Pinya's own territory. According to a contemporary inscription, Shan forces ransacked much of his land. The king died on 19 March 1359 during the raids. He had no children and was succeeded by his younger brother Narathu.

Kyawswa II's decree dated 12 March 1359, issued a week before his death, is the earliest known land survey (sittan). The decree ordered lithic inscriptions to check on tax-free religious glebe lands.

Chronicle reporting differences
The royal chronicles do not necessarily agree on his birth, death, and reign dates.

Ancestry

Notes

References

Bibliography
 
 
 
 
 
 
 

Myinsaing dynasty
Pinya dynasty
1328 births
1359 deaths
14th-century Burmese monarchs